While geostrophic motion refers to the wind that would result from an exact balance between the Coriolis force and horizontal pressure-gradient forces, quasi-geostrophic (QG) motion refers to flows where the Coriolis force and pressure gradient forces are almost in balance, but with inertia also having an effect.

Origin
Atmospheric and oceanographic flows take place over horizontal length scales which are very large compared to their vertical length scale, and so they can be described using the shallow water equations. The Rossby number is a dimensionless number which characterises the strength of inertia compared to the strength of the Coriolis force. The quasi-geostrophic equations are approximations to the shallow water equations in the limit of small Rossby number, so that inertial forces are an order of magnitude smaller than the Coriolis and pressure forces. If the Rossby number is equal to zero then we recover geostrophic flow.

The quasi-geostrophic equations were first formulated by Jule Charney.

Derivation of the single-layer QG equations 

In Cartesian coordinates, the components of the geostrophic wind are
  (1a)
  (1b)
where  is the geopotential.

The geostrophic vorticity
 

can therefore be expressed in terms of the geopotential as

  (2)

Equation (2) can be used to find  from a known field .

  (3)

The material derivative in (3) is defined by

  (4)  
where  is the pressure change following the motion.

The horizontal velocity  can be separated into a geostrophic  and an ageostrophic  part

  (5)

Two important assumptions of the quasi-geostrophic approximation are

 1. , or, more precisely .
 2. the beta-plane approximation  with 

However, because the acceleration following the motion, which is given in (1) as the difference between the Coriolis force and the pressure gradient force, depends on the departure of the actual wind from the geostrophic wind, it is not permissible to simply replace the velocity by its geostrophic velocity in the Coriolis term. The acceleration in (3) can then be rewritten as

  (6)

The approximate horizontal momentum equation thus has the form

  (7)

Expressing equation (7) in terms of its components,

  (8a)

  (8b)

Taking , and noting that geostrophic wind is nondivergent (i.e.), the vorticity equation is

  (9)

 

equation (9) can therefore be written as

  (10)

The same identity using the geopotential

  (11)

An analogous equation dependent on these two variables can be derived from the thermodynamic energy equation

  (12)

In the midtroposphere,  ≈ .

  (13)

If for simplicity  were set to 0, eliminating  in equations (11) and (13) yields 

  (14)

Equation (14) is often referred to as the geopotential tendency equation.  It relates the local geopotential tendency (term A) to the vorticity advection distribution (term B) and thickness advection (term C).

The same identity using the quasi-geostrophic potential vorticity

Using the chain rule of differentiation, term C can be written as

  (15)

But based on the thermal wind relation,

 .

The first term can be combined with term B in equation (14) which, upon division by   can be expressed in the form of a conservation equation 

  (16)

where  is the quasi-geostrophic potential vorticity defined by

  (17)

The three terms of equation (17) are, from left to right, the geostrophic relative vorticity, the planetary vorticity and the stretching vorticity.

Implications 

As an air parcel moves about in the atmosphere, its relative, planetary and stretching vorticities may change but equation (17) shows that the sum of the three must be conserved following the geostrophic motion.

Equation (17) can be used to find  from a known field .

References 

Fluid mechanics
Synoptic meteorology and weather